Ana Laura Chávez (born February 18, 1986), commonly known as Ana Laura, is an American singer of Contemporary Christian musician. She released a self-titled debut album in 2006 and had two hit singles on Christian radio, ("Water" and "Completely"). She also contributed to the Christmas compilation Come Let Us Adore Him. She supported democratic nominee Joe Biden in the 2020 election. She is part owner of Brownsville Piano Studio. Ana Laura runs City de Arte.

Discography

Albums

Singles

Music Videos 
Ana Laura EPK (2005)

Compilation Contributions 
Come Let Us Adore Him, 2005 - "Sanctus", "Holy, Holy Lord"
Facing the Giants, 2006 - "Completely"

External Links 
Ana Laura at IMDB
Ana Laura at MySpace

References 

1986 births
Living people
21st-century American women singers
American musicians of Mexican descent
American Seventh-day Adventists
American women pop singers
American performers of Christian music
People from Brownsville, Texas
21st-century American singers